Arup Kumar Khan is an Indian politician. He was elected as MLA of Onda Vidhan Sabha Constituency in 2011 and 2016 in West Bengal Legislative Assembly. He is an All India Trinamool Congress politician.

References

Year of birth missing (living people)
Trinamool Congress politicians from West Bengal
West Bengal MLAs 2011–2016
West Bengal MLAs 2016–2021
Living people